Hannahsville is an unincorporated community on the Cheat River in Tucker County, West Virginia, United States. Hannahsville lies along West Virginia Route 72.

Unincorporated communities in Tucker County, West Virginia
Unincorporated communities in West Virginia